The Arthur O. Eve Higher Education Opportunity Program (HEOP) is a partnership between the State of New York and its independent colleges that provides scholarships to economically and educationally disadvantaged residents. It is mainly awarded to underrepresented minority students, such as African Americans and Hispanics.

HEOP is funded jointly by participating colleges and the New York State Arthur O. Eve Higher Education Opportunity Program, and supported, in part, by a grant from the New York State Education Department.

All HEOP students must be New York State residents (including undocumented immigrants) and must meet both financial and academic guidelines.  The HEOP program was funded under Title V of the Elementary and Secondary Education Act of 1965 and was approved by Governor Nelson Rockefeller of New York.

The program provides grants ranging from $40,000-$61,000 to more than 50 colleges to fund students admitted through HEOP.  

In order to be eligible for the Higher Education Opportunity Program, a student must have been a New York State resident for 1 year, have a high school or equivalent state-approved diploma (such as the Armed Forces), be academically disadvantaged (meaning the student would not be admitted according to regular admission standards), be financially disadvantaged (based on income cutoffs, varying by college), and demonstrate ambition to succeed.

Participating institutions 
 Alfred University
 Alliance University
 Bard College
 Barnard College
 Boricua College
 Canisius College
 Cazenovia College
 Clarkson University
 College of Mount Saint Vincent
 College of Saint Rose
 Columbia University (Columbia College & School of Engineering and Applied Science)
 Cornell University
 Daemen College
 D'Youville University
 Five Towns College
 Fordham University
 Hamilton College
 Hilbert College
 Hobart and William Smith Colleges
 Ithaca College
 Keuka College
 LeMoyne College
 Long Island University (Brooklyn and C.W. Post campuses)
 Manhattan College
 Marist College
 Marymount Manhattan College
 Medaille College
 Mercy College
 Mount Saint Mary College
 Nazareth College
 The New School
 New York Institute of Technology (Manhattan Center)
 New York University
 Niagara University
 Paul Smith's College
 Pratt Institute
 Rochester Institute of Technology
 Russell Sage College
 Sage College of Albany
 St. Bonaventure University
 St. John Fisher University
 St. Lawrence University
 St. Thomas Aquinas College
 Siena College
 Skidmore College
 Syracuse University (including continuing education)
 Trocaire College
 Union College
 University of Rochester
 Utica University
 Vaughn College of Aeronautics & Technology

References 

Scholarships in the United States